The following species in the flowering plant genus Alchemilla, the lady's mantles, are accepted by Plants of the World Online. Alchemilla has many apomictic microspecies that are difficult to distinguish on the basis of morphology alone.

Alchemilla abchasica 
Alchemilla abramovii 
Alchemilla abyssinica 
Alchemilla achtarowii 
Alchemilla acrodon 
Alchemilla acropsila 
Alchemilla acrostegia 
Alchemilla acuminatidens 
Alchemilla acutata 
Alchemilla acutidens 
Alchemilla acutiformis 
Alchemilla adelodictya 
Alchemilla aemula 
Alchemilla aenostipula 
Alchemilla aequatoriensis 
Alchemilla aequidens 
Alchemilla aggregata 
Alchemilla alba 
Alchemilla albanica 
Alchemilla albinervia 
Alchemilla alneti 
Alchemilla alpigena 
Alchemilla alpina 
Alchemilla alpinula 
Alchemilla altaica 
Alchemilla amardica 
Alchemilla amauroptera 
Alchemilla amblyodes 
Alchemilla amicorum 
Alchemilla amoena 
Alchemilla amphiargyrea 
Alchemilla amphibola 
Alchemilla amphipsila 
Alchemilla amphisericea 
Alchemilla anceps 
Alchemilla andina 
Alchemilla angustata 
Alchemilla angustiserrata 
Alchemilla animosa 
Alchemilla anisiaca 
Alchemilla anisopoda 
Alchemilla antiropata 
Alchemilla aperta 
Alchemilla aphanoides 
Alchemilla appressipila 
Alchemilla aranica 
Alchemilla argentidens 
Alchemilla arguteserrata 
Alchemilla argyrophylla 
Alchemilla armeniaca 
Alchemilla aroanica 
Alchemilla arvensis 
Alchemilla aspera 
Alchemilla aspleniifolia 
Alchemilla asteroantha 
Alchemilla atlantica 
Alchemilla atriuscula 
Alchemilla atropurpurea 
Alchemilla atrovirens 
Alchemilla aurata 
Alchemilla auriculata 
Alchemilla australiana 
Alchemilla australis 
Alchemilla austroaltaica 
Alchemilla austroitalica 
Alchemilla babiogorensis 
Alchemilla bachiti 
Alchemilla bakeri 
Alchemilla bakurianica 
Alchemilla baltica 
Alchemilla bandericensis 
Alchemilla barbata 
Alchemilla barbatiflora 
Alchemilla benasquensis 
Alchemilla bertiscea 
Alchemilla betuletorum 
Alchemilla bicarpellata 
Alchemilla bipinnatifida 
Alchemilla biquadrata 
Alchemilla biradiata 
Alchemilla bogumilii 
Alchemilla boleslai 
Alchemilla bolusii 
Alchemilla bombycina 
Alchemilla bonae 
Alchemilla borderei 
Alchemilla borealis 
Alchemilla bornmuelleri 
Alchemilla brachetiana 
Alchemilla brachycodon 
Alchemilla braun-blanquetii 
Alchemilla brevidens 
Alchemilla breviloba 
Alchemilla brevituba 
Alchemilla bucovinensis 
Alchemilla bulgarica 
Alchemilla bungei 
Alchemilla burgensis 
Alchemilla bursensis 
Alchemilla buschii 
Alchemilla buseri 
Alchemilla buseriana 
Alchemilla cadinensis 
Alchemilla calviflora 
Alchemilla calvifolia 
Alchemilla calviformis 
Alchemilla camptopoda 
Alchemilla canifolia 
Alchemilla capensis 
Alchemilla capillacea 
Alchemilla carinthiaca 
Alchemilla carniolica 
Alchemilla cartalinica 
Alchemilla cartilaginea 
Alchemilla cashmeriana 
Alchemilla catachnoa 
Alchemilla catalaunica 
Alchemilla cataractarum 
Alchemilla caucasica 
Alchemilla cavillieri 
Alchemilla ceroniana 
Alchemilla chalarodesma 
Alchemilla charbonneliana 
Alchemilla cheirochlora 
Alchemilla chilitricha 
Alchemilla chionophila 
Alchemilla chirophylla 
Alchemilla chlorosericea 
Alchemilla chthamalea 
Alchemilla ciminensis 
Alchemilla cinerea 
Alchemilla circassica 
Alchemilla circularis 
Alchemilla circumdentata 
Alchemilla citrina 
Alchemilla colorata 
Alchemilla colura 
Alchemilla commixta 
Alchemilla compactilis 
Alchemilla compta 
Alchemilla condensa 
Alchemilla confertula 
Alchemilla conglobata 
Alchemilla conjuncta 
Alchemilla connivens 
Alchemilla consobrina 
Alchemilla contractilis 
Alchemilla controversa 
Alchemilla corcontica 
Alchemilla coriacea 
Alchemilla cornucopioides 
Alchemilla coruscans 
Alchemilla crassa 
Alchemilla crassicaulis 
Alchemilla crebridens 
Alchemilla crenulata 
Alchemilla crinita 
Alchemilla croatica 
Alchemilla cryptantha 
Alchemilla cunctatrix 
Alchemilla cuneata 
Alchemilla curaica 
Alchemilla curta 
Alchemilla curtiloba 
Alchemilla curtischista 
Alchemilla curvidens 
Alchemilla cymatophylla 
Alchemilla cyrtopleura 
Alchemilla czamsinensis 
Alchemilla czaryschensis 
Alchemilla czywczynensis 
Alchemilla daghestanica 
Alchemilla damianicensis 
Alchemilla dasyclada 
Alchemilla dasycrater 
Alchemilla debilis 
Alchemilla decalvans 
Alchemilla decumbens 
Alchemilla decurrens 
Alchemilla delitescens 
Alchemilla delphinensis 
Alchemilla demissa 
Alchemilla denticulata 
Alchemilla depexa 
Alchemilla devestiens 
Alchemilla dewildemanii 
Alchemilla deylii 
Alchemilla diademata 
Alchemilla diglossa 
Alchemilla diluta 
Alchemilla diplophylla 
Alchemilla divaricans 
Alchemilla diversiloba 
Alchemilla diversipes 
Alchemilla dolichotoma 
Alchemilla dombaica 
Alchemilla domingensis 
Alchemilla dostalii 
Alchemilla dura 
Alchemilla dzhavakhetica 
Alchemilla echinogloba 
Alchemilla effusa 
Alchemilla elata 
Alchemilla elgonensis 
Alchemilla elisabethae 
Alchemilla ellenbeckii 
Alchemilla ellenbergiana 
Alchemilla elongata 
Alchemilla epidasys 
Alchemilla epipsila 
Alchemilla equisetiformis 
Alchemilla erectilis 
Alchemilla ericoides 
Alchemilla erodiifolia 
Alchemilla erythropoda 
Alchemilla erythropodoides 
Alchemilla erzincanensis 
Alchemilla espotensis 
Alchemilla eugenii 
Alchemilla eurystoma 
Alchemilla exaperta 
Alchemilla excentrica 
Alchemilla exigua 
Alchemilla exilis 
Alchemilla exsanguis 
Alchemilla exsculpta 
Alchemilla exuens 
Alchemilla exul 
Alchemilla faeroensis 
Alchemilla fagetii 
Alchemilla fallax 
Alchemilla farinosa 
Alchemilla federiciana 
Alchemilla filicaulis 
Alchemilla firma 
Alchemilla fischeri 
Alchemilla fissa 
Alchemilla fissimima 
Alchemilla flabellata 
Alchemilla flavescens 
Alchemilla flavicoma 
Alchemilla flavovirens 
Alchemilla flexicaulis 
Alchemilla floribunda 
Alchemilla florulenta 
Alchemilla fluminea 
Alchemilla fokinii 
Alchemilla fontinalis 
Alchemilla fontqueri 
Alchemilla frigens 
Alchemilla frigida 
Alchemilla frondosa 
Alchemilla frost-olsenii 
Alchemilla fulgens 
Alchemilla fulgida 
Alchemilla fulvescens 
Alchemilla fusoidea 
Alchemilla gaillardiana 
Alchemilla galaninii 
Alchemilla galioides 
Alchemilla galkinae 
Alchemilla galpinii 
Alchemilla gemmia 
Alchemilla georgica 
Alchemilla gibberulosa 
Alchemilla giewontica 
Alchemilla gigantodus 
Alchemilla gingolphiana 
Alchemilla glabra 
Alchemilla glabricaulis 
Alchemilla glabriformis 
Alchemilla glacialis 
Alchemilla glaucescens 
Alchemilla glomerulans 
Alchemilla glyphodonta 
Alchemilla goloskokovii 
Alchemilla gorcensis 
Alchemilla gourzae 
Alchemilla grandiceps 
Alchemilla grandidens 
Alchemilla grenieri 
Alchemilla grisebachiana 
Alchemilla grossheimii 
Alchemilla grossidens 
Alchemilla gruneica 
Alchemilla guatemalensis 
Alchemilla gymnopoda 
Alchemilla hagenia 
Alchemilla hamzaoglui 
Alchemilla haraldii 
Alchemilla haumanii 
Alchemilla hebescens 
Alchemilla helenae 
Alchemilla helvetica 
Alchemilla hendrickxii 
Alchemilla heptagona 
Alchemilla hessii 
Alchemilla heterophylla 
Alchemilla heteropoda 
Alchemilla heteroschista 
Alchemilla heterotricha 
Alchemilla hians 
Alchemilla hildebrandtii 
Alchemilla hirsuticaulis 
Alchemilla hirsutiflora 
Alchemilla hirsutissima 
Alchemilla hirsutopetiolata 
Alchemilla hirta 
Alchemilla hirtipedicellata 
Alchemilla hirtipes 
Alchemilla hispanica 
Alchemilla hispidula 
Alchemilla hissarica 
Alchemilla holocycla 
Alchemilla holosericea 
Alchemilla homoeophylla 
Alchemilla hoppeana 
Alchemilla hoppeaniformis 
Alchemilla hoverlensis 
Alchemilla humilicaulis 
Alchemilla hybrida 
Alchemilla hyperborea 
Alchemilla hypercycla 
Alchemilla hyperptycha 
Alchemilla hypochlora 
Alchemilla hypotricha 
Alchemilla hyrcana 
Alchemilla ilerdensis 
Alchemilla imberbis 
Alchemilla impedicellata 
Alchemilla impexa 
Alchemilla impolita 
Alchemilla incisa 
Alchemilla inconcinna 
Alchemilla incurvata 
Alchemilla indica 
Alchemilla indivisa 
Alchemilla indurata 
Alchemilla infravallesia 
Alchemilla iniquiformis 
Alchemilla insignis 
Alchemilla integribasis 
Alchemilla inversa 
Alchemilla iratiana 
Alchemilla iremelica 
Alchemilla ischnocarpa 
Alchemilla isfarensis 
Alchemilla isodonta 
Alchemilla jailae 
Alchemilla jamesonii 
Alchemilla japonica 
Alchemilla jaquetiana 
Alchemilla jaroschenkoi 
Alchemilla jasiewiczii 
Alchemilla johnstonii 
Alchemilla jugensis 
Alchemilla jumrukczalica 
Alchemilla kemlensis 
Alchemilla kerneri 
Alchemilla killipii 
Alchemilla kiwuensis 
Alchemilla kolaensis 
Alchemilla kornasiana 
Alchemilla kosiarensis 
Alchemilla kozlovskii 
Alchemilla krassovskiana 
Alchemilla krylovii 
Alchemilla kulczynskii 
Alchemilla kurdica 
Alchemilla kvarkushensis 
Alchemilla ladislai 
Alchemilla laeta 
Alchemilla laeticolor 
Alchemilla laevipes 
Alchemilla lainzii 
Alchemilla languescens 
Alchemilla languida 
Alchemilla lanuginosa 
Alchemilla lasenii 
Alchemilla laxa 
Alchemilla laxescens 
Alchemilla lechleriana 
Alchemilla ledebourii 
Alchemilla legionensis 
Alchemilla leiophylla 
Alchemilla leptoclada 
Alchemilla lessingiana 
Alchemilla leutei 
Alchemilla lindbergiana 
Alchemilla lineata 
Alchemilla lipschitzii 
Alchemilla lithophila 
Alchemilla litwinowii 
Alchemilla longana 
Alchemilla longidens 
Alchemilla longinodis 
Alchemilla longipes 
Alchemilla longituba 
Alchemilla longiuscula 
Alchemilla looseri 
Alchemilla lorata 
Alchemilla loxotropa 
Alchemilla lucida 
Alchemilla ludovitiana 
Alchemilla lunaria 
Alchemilla lycopodioides 
Alchemilla lydiae 
Alchemilla macrescens 
Alchemilla macrochira 
Alchemilla macroclada 
Alchemilla madurensis 
Alchemilla malimontana 
Alchemilla malyi 
Alchemilla mandoniana 
Alchemilla maradykovensis 
Alchemilla marginata 
Alchemilla maroccana 
Alchemilla marsica 
Alchemilla martinii 
Alchemilla mastodonta 
Alchemilla matreiensis 
Alchemilla maureri 
Alchemilla mazandarana 
Alchemilla megalodonta 
Alchemilla melancholica 
Alchemilla melanoscytos 
Alchemilla micans 
Alchemilla michelsonii 
Alchemilla microbetula 
Alchemilla microcarpa 
Alchemilla microcephala 
Alchemilla microdictya 
Alchemilla microdonta 
Alchemilla microscopica 
Alchemilla microsphaerica 
Alchemilla mininzonii 
Alchemilla minusculiflora 
Alchemilla minutidens 
Alchemilla minutiflora 
Alchemilla mollifolia 
Alchemilla mollis 
Alchemilla moncophila 
Alchemilla montenegrina 
Alchemilla monticola 
Alchemilla montserratii 
Alchemilla moritziana 
Alchemilla multidens 
Alchemilla multiloba 
Alchemilla murbeckiana 
Alchemilla murisserica 
Alchemilla mutisii 
Alchemilla mystrostigma 
Alchemilla nafarroana 
Alchemilla natalensis 
Alchemilla neglecta 
Alchemilla nemoralis 
Alchemilla nietofelineri 
Alchemilla niphogeton 
Alchemilla nitida 
Alchemilla nivalis 
Alchemilla norica 
Alchemilla nudans 
Alchemilla nydeggeriana 
Alchemilla obconiciflora 
Alchemilla obesa 
Alchemilla obscura 
Alchemilla obsoleta 
Alchemilla obtegens 
Alchemilla obtusa 
Alchemilla obtusiformis 
Alchemilla oculimarina 
Alchemilla oirotica 
Alchemilla oligantha 
Alchemilla oligotricha 
Alchemilla omalophylla 
Alchemilla opaca 
Alchemilla ophioreina 
Alchemilla orbicans 
Alchemilla orbiculata 
Alchemilla orduensis 
Alchemilla oriturcica 
Alchemilla orizabensis 
Alchemilla orthotricha 
Alchemilla oscensis 
Alchemilla othmarii 
Alchemilla oxyodonta 
Alchemilla oxysepala 
Alchemilla ozana 
Alchemilla pachyphylla 
Alchemilla paeneglabra 
Alchemilla paicheana 
Alchemilla pallens 
Alchemilla paludicola 
Alchemilla panigrahiana 
Alchemilla parcipila 
Alchemilla parijae 
Alchemilla parodii 
Alchemilla pascualis 
Alchemilla patens 
Alchemilla paupercula 
Alchemilla pavlovii 
Alchemilla pawlowskii 
Alchemilla pectinata 
Alchemilla pectiniloba 
Alchemilla pedata 
Alchemilla pedicellata 
Alchemilla pentaphyllea 
Alchemilla pentaphylloides 
Alchemilla perglabra 
Alchemilla peristerica 
Alchemilla perrieri 
Alchemilla perryana 
Alchemilla persica 
Alchemilla perspicua 
Alchemilla petiolulans 
Alchemilla petraea 
Alchemilla phalacropoda 
Alchemilla phegophila 
Alchemilla philonotis 
Alchemilla pilosiplica 
Alchemilla pinguis 
Alchemilla pinnata 
Alchemilla pirinica 
Alchemilla platygyria 
Alchemilla plicata 
Alchemilla plicatissima 
Alchemilla plicatula 
Alchemilla pogonophora 
Alchemilla polatschekiana 
Alchemilla polemochora 
Alchemilla polessica 
Alchemilla polita 
Alchemilla polonica 
Alchemilla polychroma 
Alchemilla polylepis 
Alchemilla porrectidens 
Alchemilla prasina 
Alchemilla procerrima 
Alchemilla procumbens 
Alchemilla propinqua 
Alchemilla pseudincisa 
Alchemilla pseudobungeana 
Alchemilla pseudocalycina 
Alchemilla pseudocartalinica 
Alchemilla pseudodecumbens 
Alchemilla pseudothmari 
Alchemilla pseudovenusta 
Alchemilla psilocaula 
Alchemilla psilomischa 
Alchemilla psiloneura 
Alchemilla purdiei 
Alchemilla purohitii 
Alchemilla pusilla 
Alchemilla pustynensis 
Alchemilla pycnantha 
Alchemilla pycnoloba 
Alchemilla pycnotricha 
Alchemilla quinqueloba 
Alchemilla racemulosa 
Alchemilla raddeana 
Alchemilla radiisecta 
Alchemilla ramosissima 
Alchemilla ranunculoides 
Alchemilla reflexa 
Alchemilla rehmannii 
Alchemilla reniformis 
Alchemilla repens 
Alchemilla resupinata 
Alchemilla retinerviformis 
Alchemilla retinervis 
Alchemilla retropilosa 
Alchemilla reversantha 
Alchemilla rhiphaea 
Alchemilla rhodobasis 
Alchemilla rhodocycla 
Alchemilla rhododendrophila 
Alchemilla rivulorum 
Alchemilla rizensis 
Alchemilla roccatii 
Alchemilla rubens 
Alchemilla rubidula 
Alchemilla rubricaulis 
Alchemilla rubristipula 
Alchemilla rugulosa 
Alchemilla rupestris 
Alchemilla rusbyi 
Alchemilla rutenbergii 
Alchemilla sabauda 
Alchemilla saliceti 
Alchemilla samuelssonii 
Alchemilla sandiensis 
Alchemilla sanguinolenta 
Alchemilla santanderiensis 
Alchemilla sarmatica 
Alchemilla sarmentosa 
Alchemilla sauri 
Alchemilla saxatilis 
Alchemilla saxetana 
Alchemilla scalaris 
Alchemilla schischkinii 
Alchemilla schistophylla 
Alchemilla schizophylla 
Alchemilla schlechteriana 
Alchemilla schmakovii 
Alchemilla schmidelyana 
Alchemilla sciadiophylla 
Alchemilla sciura 
Alchemilla sedelmeyeriana 
Alchemilla sejuncta 
Alchemilla semidivisa 
Alchemilla semilunaris 
Alchemilla semisecta 
Alchemilla semispoliata 
Alchemilla serbica 
Alchemilla sergii 
Alchemilla sericata 
Alchemilla sericata 
Alchemilla sericea 
Alchemilla sericoneura 
Alchemilla sericoneuroides 
Alchemilla serratisaxatilis 
Alchemilla sevangensis 
Alchemilla sibbaldiifolia 
Alchemilla sibirica 
Alchemilla sibthorpioides 
Alchemilla sierrae 
Alchemilla sintenisii 
Alchemilla sinuata 
Alchemilla sirjaevii 
Alchemilla smaragdina 
Alchemilla smirnovii 
Alchemilla smytniensis 
Alchemilla snarskisii 
Alchemilla sojakii 
Alchemilla sokolowskii 
Alchemilla spathulata 
Alchemilla speciosa 
Alchemilla spectabilior 
Alchemilla splendens 
Alchemilla sprucei 
Alchemilla squarrosula 
Alchemilla standleyi 
Alchemilla stanislaae 
Alchemilla stellaris 
Alchemilla stellulata 
Alchemilla stenantha 
Alchemilla stenoleuca 
Alchemilla stevenii 
Alchemilla stichotricha 
Alchemilla stiriaca 
Alchemilla straminea 
Alchemilla stricta 
Alchemilla strictissima 
Alchemilla strigosula 
Alchemilla stuhlmannii 
Alchemilla suavis 
Alchemilla subalpina 
Alchemilla subcrenata 
Alchemilla subcrenatiformis 
Alchemilla subcrispata 
Alchemilla suberectipila 
Alchemilla subglobosa 
Alchemilla subnivalis 
Alchemilla subsericea 
Alchemilla subsessilis 
Alchemilla subsplendens 
Alchemilla substrigosa 
Alchemilla sukaczevii 
Alchemilla superata 
Alchemilla supina 
Alchemilla surculosa 
Alchemilla szaferi 
Alchemilla tacikii 
Alchemilla taernaensis 
Alchemilla tamarae 
Alchemilla taurica 
Alchemilla tenerifolia 
Alchemilla tenerrima 
Alchemilla tenuis 
Alchemilla thaumasia 
Alchemilla tianschanica 
Alchemilla tichomirovii 
Alchemilla tirolensis 
Alchemilla tiryalensis 
Alchemilla transcaucasica 
Alchemilla transiens 
Alchemilla transiliensis 
Alchemilla transpolaris 
Alchemilla tredecimloba 
Alchemilla trichocrater 
Alchemilla triphylla 
Alchemilla trollii 
Alchemilla trullata 
Alchemilla trunciloba 
Alchemilla tubulosa 
Alchemilla turkulensis 
Alchemilla turuchanica 
Alchemilla tytthantha 
Alchemilla tzvelevii 
Alchemilla undulata 
Alchemilla uniflora 
Alchemilla urceolata 
Alchemilla vaccariana 
Alchemilla valdehirsuta 
Alchemilla velutina 
Alchemilla venosa 
Alchemilla venosula 
Alchemilla ventiana 
Alchemilla venusta 
Alchemilla verae 
Alchemilla veronicae 
Alchemilla versipila 
Alchemilla versipiloides 
Alchemilla verticillata 
Alchemilla vetteri 
Alchemilla villarii 
Alchemilla villosa 
Alchemilla vinacea 
Alchemilla vincekii 
Alchemilla virginea 
Alchemilla viridiflora 
Alchemilla viridifolia 
Alchemilla vizcayensis 
Alchemilla volkensii 
Alchemilla vorotnikovii 
Alchemilla vranicensis 
Alchemilla vulcanica 
Alchemilla vulgaris 
Alchemilla walasii 
Alchemilla wallischii 
Alchemilla weberi 
Alchemilla westermaieri 
Alchemilla wichurae 
Alchemilla williamsii 
Alchemilla wischniewskii 
Alchemilla woodii 
Alchemilla xanthochlora 
Alchemilla ypsilotoma 
Alchemilla zapalowiczii 
Alchemilla ziganadagensis 
Alchemilla zimoenkensis 
Alchemilla zmudae 
Alchemilla zolotuchinii

References

Alchemilla